Riin Tamm (born 12 August 1981) is an Estonian geneticist and a science popularizer. She is the head of the Department of Youth and Talent Policy within the Estonian Ministry of Education and Research. She has previously served as the director of University of Tartu Youth Academy.

Early life and education 
Tamm was born in Tartu and grew up in the village of Peri, near Põlva, and is the daughter of two doctors. She attended Miina Härma Gymnasium in Tartu between 1997 and 2000. From 2001 to 2005 she was an undergraduate at the University of Tartu studying molecular diagnosis, and from 2005 to 2007 studied for her master's degree, which she obtained in 2007. Her master's thesis, prepared under supervision of Andres Metspalu and Kersti Oselin, was entitled Human thiopurine methyltransferase pharmacogenetics: genotype-phenotype correlation and haplotype analysis in the Estonian population. Following this, she began her PhD studies in human genetics.

Publications and appearances 
Tamm has published in scientific journals and presented research to a broader public in other venues, including the newspaper Postimees, Radio Kuku's program Falling Apple (Kukkuv õun – 28 August 2010), and Eesti Televisioon's program Good Vision (15 October 2009, 20 October 2011, 17 January 2012). She has been one of the judges in the Estonian science competition show Rakett69.

Tamm has said that doctors are conservative and still have relatively little interest in using genetic information to improve treatment. In a June 2012 interview she said that more work is needed to map out the human genetic structure, but much has been done already. Genetic information may help to determine risk of certain diseases, and may be useful in determining appropriate drug treatments.

Professional service 
Tamm is a board member of the Estonian Society of Human Genetics and the Estonian Association of Gerontology and Geriatrics, and is Chair of the Scientific Program Committee of the Annual International Gene Forum conference organized by the Estonian Genome Foundation. In 2011 she was chosen as one of 26 scientists to travel around Estonia and take part in events at schools and academic institutions as part of an initiative by the Archimedes Foundation and the Ministry of Education and Research.

Awards 
In 2012 she was given second prize for Estonian National Science Communication in the category "Best popularizing scientist, journalist, teacher etc in the field of science and technology".

Publications
Tamm has authored or co-authored various papers on subjects related to human genetics and gerontology, including the following:

According to the Web of Science, her publications have been cited 23 times, giving Tamm an h-index of 3.

References 
Citations

Sources

External links

 Riin Tamm: explaining genetics in layman's terms InTime April/May 2013

1981 births
Living people
People from Tartu
Estonian geneticists
Miina Härma Gymnasium alumni
University of Tartu alumni
Academic staff of the University of Tartu
Science communicators
Estonian women scientists